Pointe aux Sables Mates is a Mauritian football club based in Port Louis. They play in the Mauritian Second Division, the second division in Mauritian football.

The club played in the 2006 CAF Confederation Cup. They lost 4–0 on aggregate to ZESCO United of Zambia.

PAS Mates won the 2004–05 Second Division and finished runners-up in the cup. In 2014, the club received promotion back to the Mauritian top flight.

Stadium
Their home stadium is Sir Gaetan Duval Stadium (cap. 7,000), located in Beau-Bassin Rose-Hill.

Honours
Mauritian Second Division: 2004–2005, 2014–2015

Performance in CAF competitions
2006 CAF Confederation Cup: first round

References

External links

:fr:Pointe-aux-Sables Mates

Curepipe
Football clubs in Mauritius